Ryan Sceviour (born June 29, 1995) is a professional Canadian football offensive lineman for the Calgary Stampeders of the Canadian Football League (CFL). He played U Sports football for the Calgary Dinos from 2013 to 2017.

Professional career
Sceviour was drafted in the first round, eighth overall, by the Stampeders in the 2018 CFL Draft and signed with the team on May 14, 2018. He spent most of the 2018 on the reserve roster, but dressed for one regular season game, making his professional debut on September 8, 2018. He was on the reserve roster when the Calgary Stampeders won the 106th Grey Cup. For the 2019 season, he became a regular starter, playing and starting in all 18 regular season games and one playoff game. He re-signed with the Stampeders on January 8, 2021.

References

External links
 Calgary Stampeders bio

1995 births
Living people
Canadian football offensive linemen
Calgary Dinos football players
Calgary Stampeders players
Players of Canadian football from Alberta
Canadian football people from Calgary